The Line of Beauty is a British drama television serial that was first broadcast on BBC Two on 17 May 2006. The three-part series, written by Andrew Davies and directed by Saul Dibb, is an adaptation of the 2004 novel of the same name by Alan Hollinghurst.

Cast

3 episodes
Dan Stevens as Nick Guest
Tim McInnerny as Gerald Fedden
Hayley Atwell as Catherine Fedden
Alice Krige as Rachel Fedden
Carmen du Sautoy as Elena
Alex Wyndham as Antoine 'Wani' Ouradi
James Bradshaw as Polly Tompkins
Oliver Coleman as Toby Fedden
Lydia Leonard as Penny Kent
Don Gilet as Leo Charles
Christopher Fairbank as Barry Groom

2 episodes
Oscar James as Brentford
John Warnaby as Badger
John Standing as Lord Kessler
Siri Svegler as Martine
Nikki Amuka-Bird as Rosemary Charles
Justin Salinger as Russel
Caroline Blakiston as Lady Partridge
Julia St. John as Greta Timms
David Yelland as John Timms
John Quayle as Geoffrey Titchfield
Bruno Lastra as Tristao
Tom Knight as Norman Kent

Episode list

Reception
The Independent called the series an "intelligent, properly grown-up drama." Matt Wells of The Guardian said it was a "creative flop" and "it exposed how poorly the BBC serves gay viewers." Sam Wollaston, also writing for The Guardian, praised the series and called it "wonderful". Rupert Smith, also with The Guardian, said it was a "masterclass in storytelling - but surely there was more to the 1980s than a few posh people with glossy hair?"

Home media
The DVD edition was released on 31 July 2006.

References

External links
 
 
 

2000s British drama television series
2000s British LGBT-related television series
2000s British television miniseries
2006 British television series debuts
2006 British television series endings
BBC television dramas
English-language television shows
Television shows written by Andrew Davies
Television shows based on British novels
Television series set in the 1980s
Television shows set in the United Kingdom